ASTM A572 steel is a common high strength, low alloy (HSLA) structural steel used in the United States. A572 steel properties are specified by ASTM International standards.

Grades 
A572 steel has five different grades: 42, 50, 55, 60 and 65. Each of these grades differ in their mechanical properties and chemical composition.

Chemical Composition

Material Properties

Forms 
A572 steel is produced in a variety of different steel forms, which include:
 Plates 
 Bars
 Structural Shapes
 Channels
 I-Beams
 Angles
 Wide Flange Beams
 Sheet Piling

Applications 
A572 steel is typically used in structural applications due to its high strength, ductility, weldability and corrosion resistance. These applications include structural sections, reinforcing bars, bridges, skyscrapers and houses.

References

Steel
Metals